Hidden Diary (also titled Mères et filles and La Cuisine) is a 2009 Franco-Canadian drama film directed by Julie Lopes-Curval. The film tells the story of three generations of women, starring Catherine Deneuve, Marina Hands and Marie-Josée Croze.

Cast 
 Catherine Deneuve as Martine
 Marina Hands as Audrey
 Marie-Josée Croze as Louise
 Michel Duchaussoy as Michel
 Carole Franck as Evelyne
 Jean-Philippe Écoffey as Gérard
 Éléonore Hirt as Suzanne
 Gérard Watkins as Gilles
 Romano Orzari as Tom
 Nans Laborde as Pierre
 Meriem Serbah as Samira
 Louison Bergman as the young Martine
 Arthur Lurcin as the young Gérard
 Manon Percept as the young Audrey

References

External links 
 

2009 films
2009 drama films
2000s French-language films
French drama films
Canadian drama films
Films about dysfunctional families
Films directed by Julie Lopes-Curval
French-language Canadian films
2000s Canadian films
2000s French films